First opened to the public in October, 2005, Government Canyon State Natural Area (GCSNA) preserves  of rugged hills and canyons typical of the Texas Hill Country. It is designated a Natural Area, rather than a State Park, and therefore the primary focus is maintenance and protection of the property's natural state. Accordingly, access and recreational activities may be restricted if the Texas Parks & Wildlife Department (TPWD) deems such action necessary to protect the environment.

The reserve is located in northwestern Bexar County, and protects a large, relatively pristine tract of Hill Country terrain, numerous and diverse species of plants & wildlife, the upper Culebra Creek/Leon Creek watershed, and a critical aquifer recharge zone for the San Antonio Water System.

Fauna 
Among the many bird species present, GCSNA includes nesting habitats of the golden-cheeked warbler and the black-capped vireo, both of which are classified as endangered. As in much of the Hill Country, white-tailed deer (Odocoileus virginianus) are by far the most common large mammal on the property. Additionally, wild turkeys, armadillos, skunks, raccoons, opossums, cottontail rabbits, jack rabbits, and fox squirrels are present. Feral pigs, exotic axis deer, porcupines, rock squirrels, and ringtailed cats may occasionally be encountered. Bobcats, coyotes, both red and grey foxes, and rarely, mountain lions, also inhabit the area, but are seldom seen by visitors.

Flora 
Primary vegetation includes the Ashe juniper, commonly known as "mountain cedar", several different species of oak, also sycamore, mesquite, persimmon, mountain laurel, Texas madrone, redbud, maple, hackberry, cedar elm, mulberry, wild grape, several different types of brush, prickly pear, yucca, sotol, and various grasses. A more extensive list of the fauna and flora present in the park can be found at the GCSNA Ranger Station.

Visitors 
Entrance fee: $6 per adult; children 12 and under, free. Beginning Friday, October 5, 2012 the Natural Area will allow overnight camping on Fridays and Saturdays in the "Front Country" section only. There are regular walk-in  campsites, and two group walk-in campsites that allow up to 16 persons per site.

TPWD urges all visitors to respect the LEAVE NO TRACE set of wilderness ethics when visiting the Natural Area: 1) Plan Ahead and Prepare, 2) Travel on Marked Trails Only, 3) Always Dispose of Waste Properly, 4) Leave Behind What You Find, 5) Never Build An Open Fire, 6) Respect All Wildlife, and 7) Be Considerate of Other Visitors.

References

Other sources
Texas Parks & Wildlife: City of San Antonio Transfers Almost 3,000 Acres to Government Canyon
My San Antonio: City gives 3,000 acres of Government Canyon to state
Leon Springs Business Association: City land to go to Government Canyon
My San Antonio: City earns praise for land transfer
My San Antonio: 461 more acres for Government Canyon

External links

TPWD – Government Canyon State Natural Area
Friends of Government Canyon
 Add'l TPWD info

Protected areas of Bexar County, Texas
State parks of Texas
Geography of San Antonio
Tourist attractions in San Antonio
Parks in San Antonio